Sihugo "Si" Green (August 20, 1933 – October 4, 1980) was an American professional basketball player. After playing college basketball for the Duquesne Dukes, he was selected as the first pick of the 1956 NBA draft by the Rochester Royals.

College career
Green attended Boys High School in Brooklyn, New York, where he played for coach Mickey Fisher.

Green then attended Duquesne (1953–1956), where he starred alongside teammate Dick Ricketts and his younger brother, Dave Ricketts. As a sophomore in 1953–1954, Green averaged 13.4 points and 8.2 rebounds, as the Dukes went 26–3 under Coach Dudey Moore, losing in the Final of the 1954 National Invitation Tournament to Holy Cross with future Hall of Famer Tommy Heinsohn.

In 1954–1955,  Green averaged 22.0 points and 13.6 rebounds and the Dukes were 22–4, winning the 1955 National Invitation Tournament. In the Final, on March 20, 1955, Duquesne beat the Dayton Flyers 70–58 before a sellout crowd of 18,496 at Madison Square Garden, as Green scored 33 points and Dick Ricketts had 23.

As senior in 1955–1956, Green averaged 24.5 points and 13.2 rebounds as Duquesne was 17–10 following Dick Ricketts's graduation the year prior. The Dukes won 7 of their last 8 after a slow start to advance to the quarterfinals of the 1956 National Invitation Tournament, losing to eventual champion Louisville.

Professional career
A 6'2" guard-forward, on April 30, Green was selected by the Rochester Royals as the first overall NBA draft pick of the 1956 NBA draft over Bill Russell, the University of San Francisco star center. The St. Louis Hawks chose Russell one spot later; the Hawks traded Russell to the Boston Celtics and the Celtics went on to win 11 of the next 13 NBA titles together.

As a rookie in 1956–1957, Green averaged 11.5 points, 5.2 rebounds and 3.6 assists in 14 games for the Royals, he also played some games that season for the Easton Madisons of the EPBL. Green then missed the next NBA season due to military service with the U.S. Army. There, he played on a Fort Dix team with Tom Gola and Alvin Clinkscales that won the U.S. Army championship.

On January 14, 1959, while averaging 12.5 points, 7.0 rebounds and 4.3 assists, Green was traded by the Cincinnati Royals to the St. Louis Hawks for Med Park and Jack Stephens. Green played four seasons for St. Louis, averaging 6.9 points and 4.4 rebounds.

Green was traded by the St. Louis Hawks to the Chicago Packers on November 21, 1961. He was traded, along with Joe Graboski and Woody Sauldsberry for Barney Cable and Archie Dees. With Chicago in 57 games that season, he averaged 13.2 points, 5.6 rebounds and 4.5 assists.

On October 10, 1965, Green was traded by the Baltimore Bullets to the Boston Celtics for a 1966 fifth round draft pick (John Jones was later selected). He averaged 3.2 points in 10 games in a reserve role for the Celtics, playing his last NBA game on November 20, 1965. Green then joined the New Haven Elms of the EPBA for the remainder of the season. With the Celtics, Green played with his fellow 1956 draft pick, Bill Russell.

Green last played for the Wilmington Jets of the Eastern Professional Basketball League in 1966–1967.

Overall, Green played nine seasons in the league NBA with four teams, scoring 5,039 career points and averaging 9.2 points, 4.3 rebounds and 3.3. assists in 504 career games.

Personal life
"Si never said a word. He always wore his jumping socks, those thick gray ones with a green trim. The kind hunters wear. That was his superstition. Si's touch outside with a line-drive jumper was pretty good, but he could tell you he was going around you and he'd still get around you. He would give you a fake and a real big first stride," former Duquesne assistant coach Red Manning said in describing Green years later.

Green died of cancer in Pittsburgh, Pennsylvania on October 4, 1980 at age 47.

Honors
 No. 11 retired by Duquesne University
 Green was named to the Duquesne All-Century Team in 2016.

References

External links
Sihugo Green Info Page at NBA.com

Sihugo Green Personal Contract Collection

1933 births
1980 deaths
Basketball players from New York City
African-American basketball players
All-American college men's basketball players
American men's basketball players
Baltimore Bullets (1963–1973) players
Boston Celtics players
Boys High School (Brooklyn) alumni
Chicago Packers players
Chicago Zephyrs players
Cincinnati Royals players
Deaths from cancer in Pennsylvania
Duquesne Dukes men's basketball players
New Haven Elms players
Point guards
Rochester Royals draft picks
Rochester Royals players
St. Louis Hawks players
Wilmington Blue Bombers players
20th-century African-American sportspeople